A general election is a political voting election where generally all or most members of a given political body are chosen. These are usually held for a nation, state, or territory's primary legislative body, and are different from by-elections (only one electorate goes to election).
In most systems, a general election is a regularly scheduled election where both a head of government (such as president or prime minister), and either "a class" or all members of a legislature are elected at the same time. Occasionally, dates for general elections may align with dates of elections within different administrative divisions, such as a local election.

United Kingdom

The term general election in the United Kingdom often refers to the elections held on the same day in all constituencies of their members of Parliament (MPs) to the House of Commons. 

Historically, English and later British general elections took place over a period of several weeks, with individual constituencies holding polling on different days. The Parliament Act 1911 introduced the requirement that elections in all parliamentary constituencies be held on the same day. There has been a convention since the 1930s that general elections in Britain should take place on a Thursday; the last general election to take place on any other weekday was that of 1931.

Under the terms of the Fixed-term Parliaments Act 2011, in force until March 2022, the period between one general election and the next was fixed at five years, unless the House of Commons passed
 a motion of no confidence in the Government sooner than that, and did not pass a motion of confidence in a new Government within fourteen days, or;
 a motion, approved by two-thirds of its members, resolving that a general election should take place sooner, or;
 a proposal from the prime minister to reschedule an election mandated by the Act to no later than two months after the original date.

Although not provided for in the Fixed-term Parliaments Act, an early election could also be brought about by an act of parliament specifically calling for a general election, which (unlike the second option above) only required a simple majority. This was the mechanism used to precipitate the December 2019 election, when the Early Parliamentary General Election Act 2019 was enacted.

The Fixed-term Parliaments Act was repealed by the Dissolution and Calling of Parliament Act 2022.

The term general election is also used in the United Kingdom to refer to elections to any democratically elected body in which all members are up for election. Section 2 of the Scotland Act 1998, for example, specifically refers to ordinary elections to the Scottish Parliament as general elections.

United States 

In U.S. politics, general elections are elections held at any level (e.g. city, county, congressional district, state) that typically involve competition between at least two parties.  General elections occur every two to six years (depending on the positions being filled with most positions good for four years) and include the presidential election, but unlike parliamentary systems, the term can also refer to special elections that fill out positions prematurely vacated by the previous office holder (e.g. through death, resignation, etc.). Some parallels can be drawn between the general election in parliamentary systems and the biennial elections determining all House seats, although there is no analogue to "calling early elections" in the U.S., and the members of the elected U.S. Senate face elections of only one-third at a time at two-year intervals including during a general election.

Unlike parliamentary systems where the term general election is distinguished from by-elections or local and regional elections, the term is used in the US and distinguished from primaries or caucuses, which are intra-party elections meant to select a party's official candidate for a particular race.  Thus, if a primary is meant to elect a party's candidate for the position-in-question, a general election is meant to elect who occupies the position itself.

In the State of Louisiana the expression general election means the runoff election which occurs between the two highest candidates as determined by the jungle primary.

See also
Writ of election

Footnotes

External links

International IDEA's Electoral Processes Program
A New Nation Votes: American Election Returns 1787-1825
General Election 2010

Elections